Hell Among the Yearlings is the second studio album by American singer-songwriter Gillian Welch, released on July 28, 1998.

Track listing

Musicians
Tracks 1, 2, 4, 6, 8, 11
Gillian Welch: Acoustic guitar, vocal
David Rawlings: Acoustic guitar, vocal

Tracks 3, 5, 9
Gillian Welch: Banjo, vocal
David Rawlings: Acoustic guitar, vocal

Track 7
Gillian Welch: Acoustic guitar, bass, kick drum, vocal
David Rawlings: Electric guitar, snare drum, vocal

Track 10
Gillian Welch: Acoustic guitar, vocal
David Rawlings: Electric guitar
T Bone Burnett: Piano, Hammond B3

Production
Assistant Engineers: Nick Raskulinecz, Matt Andrews, John Skinner, Robi Banerji, King Williams
Mastered by Doug Sax at The Mastering Lab, Hollywood CA
Creative Direction: Tony Maxwell

All musician and production credits were taken from the CD liner notes.

Charts

References 

1998 albums
Albums produced by T Bone Burnett
Gillian Welch albums